The 2013–14 Ukrainian Basketball SuperLeague was the 23rd edition of the Ukrainian top-tier basketball championship. The season has started on 9 October 2013. Budivelnyk won its 8th Ukrainian title, by beating BC Khimik in the 3–1 Finals.

Participants

Regular season

Playoffs

Bracket

Quarterfinals 
Khimik - BC Kyiv 2-0 (84:55, 65:61)
BC Donetsk - Ferro-ZNTU 2-0 (92:75, 77:65)
Budivelnyk - MBC Mykolaiv 2-0 (92:69, 90:68)
Azovmash - BC Odesa 2-0 (74:52, 67:44)

Semifinals 
Khimik - BC Donetsk 3-0 (78:67, 91:60, 91:79)
Budivelnyk - Azovmash 3-1 (76:43, 75:63, 73:91, 92:81)

Third place 
Azovmash - BC Donetsk 3-0 (82:61, 82:73, 75:53)

Final 
Khimik - Budivelnyk 1-3 (65:74, 73:70, 72:82, 77:85)

Awards

Most Valuable Player
 Darjuš Lavrinovič – Budivelnyk

Ukrainian clubs in European competitions

Ukrainian clubs in Regional competitions

References 

Ukrainian Basketball SuperLeague seasons
1
Ukraine